Braddick is a surname. Notable people with the surname include:

Michael Braddick (born 1962), British historian and academic
Oliver Braddick (1944–2022), British developmental psychologist
Reg Braddick (1913–1999), Welsh racing cyclist

See also
Braddock (surname)